Robert Daniel Cooney (July 12, 1907 – May 4, 1976) was an American baseball pitcher who played for the St. Louis Browns of Major League Baseball in  and .

External links
Baseball Reference.com

1907 births
1976 deaths
St. Louis Browns players
Major League Baseball pitchers
Baseball players from New York (state)
Fordham Rams baseball players
Sportspeople from Glens Falls, New York
Burials in Saratoga County, New York
Elmira Pioneers players
Hazleton Mountaineers players
Scranton Miners players
Topeka Senators players
Tulsa Oilers (baseball) players
Wilkes-Barre Barons (baseball) players